Hyphomicrobium hollandicum is an aerobic bacteria from the genus of Hyphomicrobium which was isolated from soil in California in the US.

References

Hyphomicrobiales
Bacteria described in 1989